Bignot is an English surname. Notable people with the surname include:

 Paul Bignot (born 1986), English footballer
 Marcus Bignot (born 1974), English footballer and manager

See also
 Bignon
 Bignor

English-language surnames